Aprusia is a genus of goblin spiders in the family Oonopidae, containing eight accepted species. seven species are endemic to Sri Lanka and the other species is endemic to India.

Species
 it contains eight species:
 Aprusia kataragama Grismado & Deeleman, 2011 — Sri Lanka
 Aprusia kerala Grismado & Deeleman, 2011 — India
 Aprusia koslandensis Ranasinghe & Benjamin, 2018 — Sri Lanka
 Aprusia rawanaellensis Ranasinghe & Benjamin, 2018 — Sri Lanka
 Aprusia strenuus Simon, 1893 — Sri Lanka
 Aprusia vankhedei Ranasinghe & Benjamin, 2018 — Sri Lanka
 Aprusia veddah Grismado & Deeleman, 2011 — Sri Lanka
 Aprusia vestigator (Simon, 1893) — Sri Lanka

References 

Oonopidae
Araneomorphae genera
Spiders of Asia